In Search of Hades: The Virgin Recordings 1973 - 1979 is a deluxe 2019 7-album 16-CD compilation box set by Tangerine Dream. It is roughly the group's 157th release.

Overview  
In Search of Hades: The Virgin Recordings 1973 - 1979 includes: 
 Phaedra (1974) (new Stereo and 5.1 Surround Sound mixes by producer Steven Wilson), 
 Rubycon (1975), 
 Ricochet (1975) (new Stereo and 5.1 Surround Sound mixes by producer Steven Wilson), 
 Stratosfear (1976), 
 Encore (1977), 
 Cyclone (1978), and 
 Force Majeure (1979). 

The box set also includes the group's previously unreleased soundtrack to the theatrical play Oedipus Tyrannus, also mixed by Wilson. Two Blu-ray discs of previously-unreleased concert footage are also included, as well as a 68-page hardcover book with never-before-seen photos.

Personnel
Edgar Froese - synthesizers, guitar

References

2019 compilation albums
Tangerine Dream compilation albums